Tseten Dolma is a Tibetan soprano. She was born August 1, 1937 to a serf family in Shigatse, Tibet. Tseten was influenced by Tibetan folk music from a very young age, and first performed on stage in 1956. She is known for starring in the 1965 musical epic The East Is Red.

In 1958, she joined the Shanghai Conservatory of Music, learning from professor Wang Pinsu. She has served the Tibet branch of the Chinese Musicians' Association in various roles since the 1960s, including being chairman, director and vice-chairman of CMA, deputy secretary of Bureau of Cultural Affairs of Tibet Autonomous Region.

Personal life
Tseten Dolma married Namgyal Dorje in 1957, who she bore a daughter, Nyima Dolma, in 1966, and then a son, Nyima Tsering, in 1974.

Notable works
Tsetsun Dolma is famous for the following songs:
On the Golden Mountain of Beijing (《在北京的金山上》)
Emancipated Serfs Sing Proudly (《翻身农奴把歌唱》)
Flying goose (《远飞的大雁》)
Heart Song (《唱起心中的歌》)
Happy Songs (《幸福的歌声》)
Spring Wind Waves in My Heart (《春风在心中荡漾》)
Lhobas are Flying High (《珞巴展翅飞翔》)

References

External links
 Tseten Dolma

20th-century Tibetan women singers
1937 births
Living people
20th-century Chinese women singers
Chinese sopranos
People from Shigatse
Chinese folk singers
Members of the 4th Chinese People's Political Consultative Conference
Members of the 7th Chinese People's Political Consultative Conference
Members of the 8th Chinese People's Political Consultative Conference
Members of the 9th Chinese People's Political Consultative Conference
Members of the Standing Committee of the 5th National People's Congress
Delegates to the 6th National People's Congress